The House Subcommittee on Health, Employment, Labor, and Pensions is a standing subcommittee within the United States House Committee on Education and Labor. It was formerly known as the Subcommittee on Employer-Employee Relations.

Jurisdiction
From the Official Subcommittee website, the Subcommittee's jurisdiction includes:
Matters dealing with relationships between employers and employees, including but not limited to the National Labor Relations Act, the Labor-Management Relations Act, and the Labor-Management Reporting and Disclosure Act
the Bureau of Labor Statistics
and employment-related health and retirement security, including but not limited to pension, health, other employee benefits, and the Employee Retirement Income Security Act

Members, 118th Congress

Historical membership rosters

115th Congress

116th Congress

117th Congress

References

External links
 Subcommittee page

Education Health, Employment, Labor, and Pensions